The third season of The Fugitive originally aired Tuesdays at 10:00-11:00 pm on ABC from September 14, 1965 to April 26, 1966. The season was released through two volumes on Region 1 DVDs, with the first volume (containing the first 15 episodes) being released on October 27, 2009 and Volume 2 being released on December 8, 2009.

Episodes

References

The Fugitive (TV series) seasons